Westchester Library System (WLS) is the library system for the residents of Westchester County, New York. It was established in 1958. The system has 38 public libraries across the county and its headquarters are located in the town of Greenburgh, near Elmsford.

About
The Westchester Library System is a state-chartered, cooperative library system serving all 38 Westchester member public libraries and the county's citizens. It is one of the 23 public library systems serving New York State's public libraries, and was established in 1958.

The mission of the Westchester Library System is to enhance and improve the county's libraries, and to ensure that all residents have excellent library service regardless of their location.

A 15-member board of trustees, elected by the trustees of the member libraries, is the governing body of the system.

Member libraries

Services

Cataloging and processing
Books, videos, recordings, and other library materials acquired by member libraries are cataloged and entered in the online "card catalog" and are made available to all cardholders.

Information technology
The system staff operates the circulation system and maintains the network, providing access to collections, various databases, and the Internet.

Delivery
A delivery service provides transportation of Library materials to each member library.

InterLibrary loan
InterLibrary loan service enables patrons to borrow materials which are not owned by any WLS library.

Outreach services
The WLS outreach services seek to improve access to public library services for all residents of Westchester County.  Outreach activities focus on developing programs and partnerships that expand the capacity of libraries to serve the needs of low-income seniors and adults seeking information on social services, education and jobs.  This work includes those who have been incarcerated, those who are institutionalized, and those with disabilities.  Direct services: support for those seeking a high school equivalency diploma and older adults seeking guidance on Medicare and related benefits.

WEBS - Career & Educational Counseling Service
WEBS offers free group and individual career counseling programs in libraries for adults in career transition as well as access to career and educational information.

Youth services
WLS coordinates programs that support the ongoing training and collaboration of librarians serving youth in Westchester County.

External relations
Develops and maintains contact with community organizations, press and media. Raises funds and visibility for member libraries and system initiatives.

Continuing education and consulting services
WLS arranges and conducts workshops and other training opportunities for professional development of member librarians and the advancement of Library trustees. Professional advice is available to member Libraries on services, programs, planning, budgeting, administration, and management.

References

External links

WLS official site

County library systems in New York (state)
Public libraries in New York (state)
Public libraries in Westchester County, New York